Debra Spark (born 1962) is an American novelist, short story writer, essayist, and editor. She teaches at Colby College and at Warren Wilson College.

Biography
Debra Spark was born in Boston, Massachusetts in 1962. She graduated from Yale University. 
Her work has appeared in AGNI, Esquire, Narrative, Ploughshares, The New York Times, Food and Wine, Yankee, Down East, The Washington Post, Maine Home + Design and The San Francisco Chronicle.

She lives with her husband and son in North Yarmouth, Maine.

Awards
 1995 John C. Zacharis First Book Award
 National Endowment for the Arts fellowship
 Bunting Institute fellowship from Radcliffe College

Works

"The Revived Art of the Toy Theatre", AGNI 58. 2003.

Anthologies

Editor

References

External links
"Author's website"

1962 births
Writers from Boston
American short story writers
Yale University alumni
Colby College faculty
Warren Wilson College faculty
Living people
People from North Yarmouth, Maine